Bodom Church (formerly called Bodom kapell) is a parish church of the Church of Norway in Steinkjer municipality in Trøndelag county, Norway. It is one of the churches for the Ogndal parish which is part of the Stiklestad prosti (deanery) in the Diocese of Nidaros. The white, wooden church was built in a long church style in 1905 using plans drawn up by the architect Søren Wiese Opsahl. The church seats about 120 people.

History
The chapel was initially built to serve the upper Ogndalen valley. David Kristian Bodom left money to the parish after his death to help fund the construction of the chapel. The new chapel was consecrated on 1 August 1905 by the Bishop Vilhelm Andreas Wexelsen. Later, the chapel was upgraded to be a full parish church. The building was extensively renovated in 1970.

See also
List of churches in Nidaros

References

Steinkjer
Churches in Trøndelag
Long churches in Norway
Wooden churches in Norway
20th-century Church of Norway church buildings
Churches completed in 1905
1905 establishments in Norway